Ordu Nefise Akçelik Tunnel, originally Hapan Tunnel, is a highway tunnel constructed in Ordu Province, northern Turkey. The tunnel is named in honor of the Turkish female civil engineer and earth scientist Nefise Akçelik (1955-2003).

Construction
Ordu Nefise Akçelik Tunnel is part of the Samsun-Ordu Highway   within the Black Sea Coastal Highway, the construction of which was carried out by the Turkish Nurol-Tekfen-Yüksel joint venture. The cost of the tunnel totalled to TL 361 million (approx. US$265 million as of 2007 exchange rate). The -long twin-tube tunnel carrying two lanes of traffic in each direction is flanked by -long Tekkebak Tunnel in the west and -long Asarkayası Tunnel in the east on the same highway. Traffic in the tunnel is controlled by 81 cameras at 16 different stations.

The tunnel crosses mountainous area between the settlements 	Yarlı and Kırlı in Perşembe district of Ordu Province at  elevation.

Naming and opening to traffic
Originally, the tunnel was named Hapan Tunnel. Its name was changed to Nefise Akçelik (1955-2003) in honor of the female civil engineer and earth scientist, who, working at the General Directorate of Highways, contributed much to the construction of tunnels in Turkey.  Finally, it was officially renamed Ordu Nefise Akçelik Tunnel in March 2007.

The tunnel was opened to traffic on April 7, 2007 by Turkish Prime Minister Recep Tayyip Erdoğan. Dangerous goods carriers are not permitted to use the tunnel.

References

External links
 Map of road tunnels in Turkey at General Directorate of Highways (Turkey) (KGM)

Road tunnels in Turkey
Transport in Ordu Province
Tunnels completed in 2007